Karawal Nagar is a census town in North East Delhi, India.

 India census, Karawal Nagar had a population of 224,281. Karawal Nagar, was also in centre of the 2020 Delhi riots.
. 

Karawal Nagar is well connected to other parts of Delhi through Delhi Metro, DTC buses, Cabs, shared and hired auto rickshaws, and Gramin Sewa.
The nearest metro station to Karawal Nagar is Johri Enclave Metro Station. The distance between Karawal Nagar and Johri Enclave metro station is just 1.8 km.
Majority of people living here use Delhi Metro and shared auto.
There are number of shops in Karawal Nagar Chowk for shopping and there are many restaurants to enjoy with family, few of them include the newly opened 12 Spoon Restro & Cafe, Vrinda Restaurant, Hariom Bhojnalaya, Deheleez Restaurant, Om Sweets, Anil Pastry Shop, Anil Sweets and the oldest Maa Anjani Restaurant.
Gopaljee Ananda Dairy and Mother Dairy parlours, a departmental store named KB's Fairprice is also situated here.
Even Vishal Mega Mart has opened in Karawal Nagar, situated on Karawal Nagar to Shiv Vihar Road.
A hypermarket Vishal Mega Mart has opened in Karawal Nagar.
Karawal Nagar is well connected to Delhi metro also.
Bank of Baroda, Bank of India, Punjab National Bank, Post Office and State Bank of India are also present here.
The politicians of Karawal Nagar have  been making number of false promises since its existence. Recent false promises include 2 lane road from Dayalpur to Shiv Vihar, a beautiful garden, good DTC bus service, and all medical and testing facility in Veer Savarkar Arogya Sansthan (expansion of the TB hospital, Karawal Nagar).
It has been six years but the 2-lane road from Dayalpur to Shiv Vihar has not been completed as yet. Just new drains have been constructed in batches on a distance of only approx. 800 metres and the complete distance is around 2 km. The MP Mr. Manoj Tiwari and the former MLA Mr. Jagdish Pradhan have laid the foundation stone and given the deadline many time for this work, but the government never met the deadlines given to the public.
There are number of potholes in Shiv Vihar to Karawal Nagar section, but the government is not looking into the matter.

Nearby places 
 Sabhapur 0 km
 Shahid Bhagat Singh Colony  0.9 km
 Police Training School  1.5 km
 Dayalpur  1.6 km
 Biharipur Extension  1.6 km
 Sonia Vihar  1.6 km
 CRPF Camp, Delhi-94  1.8 km
 Indira Vihar  1.9 
 North East Delhi  2.4 km
 Ghaziabad District  19 km
 Delhi University = 7 km 
 ISBT = 10 km  
 Anand Vihar = 12.5 km  
 Old Delhi Railway Station = 12 km
 New Delhi Railway Station = 15 km  
 Rajiv Chowk (CP) = 22 km
 Sadat pur extn = 0.4 km
 David Sr. Sec. School = 1.1 km
 New Babu Nagar F.K Ansari = 1.2 km
 Govt. School Dayalpur = 1.2 km
 Dayalpur Re-settlement colony = 1.5 km
 Khajuri Khas Colony = 1.6 km
 New chauhan pur -500 meter.

Notes

Cities and towns in North East Delhi district
Neighbourhoods in Delhi
District subdivisions of Delhi